Zbigniew Bielewicz (born August 10, 1913 in Kęty, died September 8, 2008 in Bielsko-Biała) was a Polish artist, painter, graphic designer, and teacher. He was also a soldier during World War II. He was awarded a medal for participation in the defensive war of 1939 and the "Veteran of the Fight for Freedom and Independence of the Fatherland" badge.

Life 
Bielewicz was born on 10 August 1913 in Kęty. He attended school, first in Kęty, and then in Bielsko (currently a part of Bielsko-Biała). He entered the Teachers' College in Biała Krakowska (currently a part of Bielsko-Biała). After two years, he left it to work with his father as a confectioner. In 1933 he graduated a one-year merchant training school in Bielsko. In November 1935 he joined the 4th Podhale Rifle Regiment (4. Pułk Strzelców Podhalańskich) in Cieszyn. He was then moved to the Border Protection Corps. Bielewicz took part in the September campaign, for which in 1985 he was awarded a medal for "participation in the defensive war of 1939", and in 1995 the "Veteran of the Fight for Freedom and Independence of the Fatherland" badge.   

During the occupation of Poland he lived in Żywiec, where he worked at Żywieckie Zakłady Papiernicze „Solali” (Żywiec Paper Plants "Solali") as a room painter and graphic designer of letters and signboards. On September 14, 1940 he married Janina Kubik, and in 1943 his daughter Aleksandra was born. After the war, on June 1, 1945 he resumed studying, in the Institute of Fine Arts in Kraków. In 1948 – under the guidance of professors Witold Chomicz, Jerzy Karolak and Stanisław Jakubowski – he graduated in graphic arts at this university. From 1949 to 1950 Bielewicz was working as a teacher in Nowa Ruda. In 1952 he was a drafter at Państwowe Zakłady Graficzne (State Graphic Works), and next year at Spółdzielnia „Dekoracja” ("Decoration" Cooperative, known later as Spółdzielnia Pracy Przemysłu Ludowego i Artystycznego – Folk and Art Industry Work Cooperative) in Stalinograd (currently Katowice). In 1953 he became interested in the polychromes of churches.  

In September 1956 he moved to Bielsko-Biała, where he was making signboards for Spółdzielnia „Społem” ("Społem" cooperative). In the years 1953–1984 he designed, made and renovated several dozen of altars and elements of churches and chapels in Poland, especially in the south. For example in: Kędzierzyn-Koźle, Oświęcim, Borek Strzeliński, Biała, Kiczora near Zwardoń, Ludźmierz in Podhale, Olszynka near Prudnik, Rajcza, Milówka, Lipnik (Bielsko-Biała), Walawa near Przemyśl, Rogoźnik near Nowy Targ, Przemyśl and Rybarzowice.

He had his first exhibition in the pavilion at Lenin Street (currently 3 Maja Street) in Bielsko-Biała from 15 March to 4 April 1971. It was organised by Związek Polskich Artystów Plastyków (Association of Polish Artists and Designers) which he joined in Bielsko-Biała in 1951 (ID number: 2311).

He became a full member of ZPAP (APAD) in 1972, recommended by his colleagues Jan Grabowski and Ignacy Bieniek. The following years and his retirement Bielewicz has devoted to painting for the exhibitions of the artists' association and as an amateur. Zbigniew Bielewicz died on September 8, 2008 in Bielsko-Biała. He rests at the Municipal Cemetery in Kamienica, Bielsko-Biała.

Major exhibitions

Notelist

References

Bibliography

External links 
 
 

Polish artists
Polish soldiers
Polish schoolteachers
Polish graphic designers
1913 births
2008 deaths